4947 Ninkasi, provisional designation , is a sub-kilometer asteroid, classified as near-Earth object of the Amor group, approximately 520 meters in diameter. It was discovered on 12 October 1988, by American astronomer Carolyn Shoemaker at Palomar Observatory in California.

It was named after Ninkasi, the Sumerian goddess of wine and beer, who helped the god Lugalbanda rescue the tablets of fate from the demon Zu.

With an absolute magnitude of 18.0, the asteroid is about 670–1500 meters in diameter. On 2031-Apr-20 the asteroid will pass  from Mars.

References

External links 
 
 
 

004947
Discoveries by Carolyn S. Shoemaker
Named minor planets
004947
19881012